National Highway 30 (NH 30) is a primary national highway in India. NH 30 connects Sitarganj in Uttarakhand with Ibrahimpatnam, Vijayawada in Andhra Pradesh. It starts at the junction of NH 9 at Sitarganj and ends at the junction of NH 65 at Ibrahimpatnam, Vijayawada. Development of Ibrahimpatnam-Jagadalpur Route is under process. Rajdeep Rohan joint venture is the contract agency for this project. Second bridge is under construction at pilgrimage city of Bhadrachalam which is famous for temple of Lord Shri Rama. NH-30 runs through the states of Uttarakhand, Uttar Pradesh, Madhya Pradesh, Chhattisgarh, Telangana and Andhra Pradesh in India.

History
Before renumbering of national highways, NH-30 route was variously numbered as old national highways 74, 75, 24, 24B, 27, 7,  12A, 200, 43, 16 and 221.

Route 
NH30 starts at the city of Sitarganj connecting Pilibhit, Bareilly, Tilhar, Shahjahanpur, Sitapur, Lucknow, Raebareli, Allahabad , Rewa, Jabalpur, Mandla, Raipur, Dhamtari, Charama, Kanker, Kondagaon, Jagdalpur, Sukma, Konta, Nellipaka, Bhadrachalam, Paloncha, Kothagudem, Tiruvuru and terminates at Ibrahimpatnam, Vijayawada.

Junctions list 

Uttarakhand
  Terminal near Sitarganj.
Uttar Pradesh
  near Pilibhit
  near Bareilly
  near Bareilly
  near Bareilly
  near MiranpurKatra Teh. Tilhar
  near Shahjahanpur
  near Maigalganj
  near Sitapur
  near Bakshi-ka-Talab
  near Lucknow
  near Lucknow
  near Mohanlaganj
  near Raebareli
  near Raebareli 
  near Raebareli
  near Nawabganj (Prayagraj)
  near Prayagraj
  near Prayagraj
Madhaya Pradesh
  near Jamira
  near Mangawan
  near Rewa
  near Maihar
  near Katni
  near Jabalpur 
  near Jabalpur 
  near Mandla
Chhattisgarh
  near Pondi
  near Simga
  near Raipur
  near Raipur
  near Abhanpur
  near Kurud
  near Purur
  near Kondagaon
  near Jagdalpur
Andhra Pradesh
  near Chintoor
Telangana
  near Penuballi
Andhra Pradesh
  Terminal at Ibrahimpatnam, Vijayawada.

See also 
 List of National Highways in India
 List of National Highways in India by State
 National Highways Development Project

References

External links 

 NH 30 on OpenStreetMap

National highways in India
National Highways in Uttarakhand
National Highways in Uttar Pradesh
National Highways in Madhya Pradesh
National Highways in Andhra Pradesh
National Highways in Chhattisgarh
National Highways in Telangana